Lightsword may refer to:

 Lightsaber, a fictional sword in Star Wars
 The 623d Air Control Squadron of the United States Air Force, callsigned and nicknamed "Lightsword"
 Lightsword, a GameKing game

See also
 Claíomh Solais ("Sword of Light"), an Irish mythological sword